Riz Rural District is in Riz District of Jam County, Bushehr province, Iran. At the census of 2006, its population was 1,422 in 334 households; there were 1,562 inhabitants in 409 households at the following census of 2011; and in the most recent census of 2016, the population of the rural district was 1,594 in 452 households. The largest of its five villages was Poshtu, with 985 people.

References 

Rural Districts of Bushehr Province
Populated places in Jam County